The 30th Ryder Cup Matches were held in England at The Belfry in Wishaw, Warwickshire, near Sutton Coldfield. The United States team won a second consecutive Ryder Cup, by a margin of 15 to 13 points. Europe took a slender one point lead into the Sunday singles matches in what was a close contest. Davis Love III secured victory for the U.S. by defeating Costantino Rocca at the last hole, 1 up. Through 2018, this is the most recent U.S. victory in Europe and also the last time the U.S. retained the Cup.

This was the first Ryder Cup played in Europe to be televised live in the United States by a major network, NBC. The 1989 edition was carried by the USA Network on cable, with video provided by the BBC.
The U.S. television coverage in 1985 was a highlight show on ESPN in early November, over a month after its completion. NBC took over live weekend coverage in 1991 in South Carolina.

Format
The Ryder Cup is a match play event, with each match worth one point.  The competition format predominantly used from 1987 to 1999 was as follows:
Day 1 (Friday) — 4 foursome (alternate shot) matches in a morning session and 4 fourball (better ball) matches in an afternoon session
Day 2 (Saturday) — 4 foursome matches in a morning session and 4 four-ball matches in an afternoon session
Day 3 (Sunday) — 12 singles matches
With a total of 28 points, 14 points were required to win the Cup, and 14 points were required for the defending champion to retain the Cup.  All matches were played to a maximum of 18 holes - matches that were level after 18 holes were deemed a draw with half a point going to each team.

Teams
The selection process for the European team remained similar to that used since 1985, with nine players chosen from a money list at the conclusion of the Volvo German Open on 29 August and the remaining three team members being chosen soon afterwards by the team captain. The beginning of the qualifying period was, however, extended to start with the Canon European Masters in Switzerland at the beginning of September 1992 rather than starting in January 1993. The change was made so that there would be more opportunities for the leading players to qualify by right. In 1991 two of the three captain's picks were given to José María Olazábal and Nick Faldo, then ranked two and three in the world, who had played most of their golf in the US and did not qualify automatically. A few European players declined invitations to the 1993 PGA Championship to play in the Hohe Brücke Austrian Open in order to gain Ryder Cup points. At this time prize money in the major championships played in the USA did not earn Ryder Cup points. Prior to the final event Sam Torrance had to withdraw from the final event because of injury but none of the other challengers for automatic places were able to pass him. Joakim Haeggman tied for 6th place in the German Open and rose from 14th to 10th place in the points list while Ronan Rafferty tied for 20th place and finished 11th. Gallacher made his picks on 30 August. It was widely expected that he would choose Seve Ballesteros and José María Olazábal as two of his selections and most interest centred on whether he would select Haeggman or Rafferty.

Captains picks are shown in yellow. The world rankings and records are at the start of the 1993 Ryder Cup.

Captains picks are shown in yellow. The world rankings and records are at the start of the 1993 Ryder Cup.

Friday's matches

Morning foursomes

Afternoon four-ball

Saturday's matches

Morning foursomes

Afternoon four-ball

Sunday's singles matches

Individual player records
Each entry refers to the win–loss–half record of the player.

Source:

Europe

United States

References

External links

Ryder Cup
Golf tournaments in England
Sport in Warwickshire
Ryder Cup
Ryder Cup
Ryder Cup